Sheikh (Rabbi) Ganzibra Jabbar Choheili (also known as Sheikh  Jabbar Tawūsī Al-Kuhaili, ; born 1923, died December 27, 2014) was the head of the Mandaean Council of Ahvaz, which presides over the Mandaean community of Iran.

Biography
Jabbar Choheili held the Mandaean clergical ranks of Ganzibra (head priest) and Rishama (patriarch), the highest Mandaean clergical rank. He was born in 1923 in the city of Ahvaz, Khuzestan Province, Iran into the Kuhailia (Persian pronunciation "Choheili") clan. His malwasha (baptismal name) is Mhatam Yuhana (full name: Rabbi Ganzibra Mhatam Yuhana bar Sharat; also known as Mhatam Yuhana bar Yahya; or in Arabic: Shaikh Jabar, the son of Ṭawoos) (note: Mandaeans typically have both a birth name and a baptismal name). In 1948, he traveled from Iran to Qal'at Saleh, Iraq to become initiated as a tarmida by Sheikh Abdullah, son of Sh. Sam. Sh. Jabbar. After he was ordained, Jabbar Choheili completely copied the Ginza Rabba by hand. Carlos Gelbert's Ginza Rabba (2011, 2021) is primarily based on the "Mhatam Yuhana Ginza" (2004).

Ganzibra Jabbar Choheili was the chairman and secretary general of the Mandaean Council of Ahvaz. He was also a goldsmith by profession.

He died on the morning of Sunday, December 27, 2014. He was buried in a Mandaean cemetery in Ahvaz.

Gallery

See also
Yahya Bihram, a 19th-century Mandaean priest (from Iraq)
Dakhil Aidan, the Mandaean patriarch from 1917 to 1964 (from Iraq)
Sattar Jabbar Hilo, the current Mandaean patriarch (from Iraq)

References

1923 births
2014 deaths
Mandaean priests
Iranian religious leaders
People from Ahvaz
Iranian Mandaeans
Iranian scribes
Iranian goldsmiths